Mariano Fernández (born in 1945), a native of Chile, served as the Special Representative for Haiti and Head of the United Nations Stabilization Mission in Haiti (MINUSTAH). He was appointed to this position by the United Nations Secretary-General Ban Ki-moon on 16 May 2011. 

A veteran diplomat, Fernández held various high-ranking positions in the foreign service of the Government of Chile. From 2009 to 2010, he was the Minister of Foreign Affairs of Chile. From 2006 to 2009, he serves as Chile’s Ambassador to the United States. Prior to that, he was Ambassador to a number of European countries and the EU including Great Britain (2002–2006), Spain (2000–2002) and Italy (1992–1994) and in the Chilean Mission to the European Union (1990–1992). He was the Commissioner to the International Whaling Commission from 2003 to 2007. 

In addition to his experience in diplomacy, Fernández also held a variety of positions in civil society, including a member of the Board of Directors of Radio Cooperativa, Vice-Chairman of the Italian-Latin-American Institute (ILAI) (1992–1994) and President of the Institute for European-Latin American Relations (IRELA) (1992–1994). 

Fernández studied law at the Catholic University in Santiago, Chile, and social science research methods at the University of Bonn in Germany. He is married to María Angélica Morales and has three children.

External links
 United Nations Press Release

1945 births
Living people
Pontifical Catholic University of Chile alumni
University of Bonn alumni
Christian Democratic Party (Chile) politicians
Chilean officials of the United Nations
Ambassadors of Chile to the United States
Ambassadors of Chile to the United Kingdom
Ambassadors of Chile to Spain
Ambassadors of Chile to Italy